The 1998–99 NHL season was the 82nd regular season of the National Hockey League. The league expanded to 27 teams with the addition of the Nashville Predators. The Dallas Stars finished first in regular season play, and won the Stanley Cup championship over the Buffalo Sabres on a controversial triple-overtime goal by Brett Hull.

League business 
With the addition of the expansion Nashville Predators, the NHL realigned this year to a strictly geographic six-division structure (three per conference), erasing the last vestiges of the traditional Adams/Patrick/Norris/Smythe four-division structure abandoned in 1993–94. Other than the reassignment of Colorado to the Western Conference in 1995 due to its move from Quebec, the divisions' membership had remained static for five years although several franchises had relocated. As part of this realignment, the Toronto Maple Leafs moved from the Western Conference to the Eastern Conference. This put three of the Original Six teams in the Northeast Division (Boston, Montreal, and Toronto), and the three original cities of the NHL in the Northeast (Montreal, Ottawa, and Toronto).

The Maurice "Rocket" Richard Trophy for the most goals by a player in a season made its debut this year. The first winner was Teemu Selanne of the Mighty Ducks of Anaheim.

Uniform changes
Anaheim: The third and fourth jerseys from 1997 got new socks.
Boston: The team wore a 75th-anniversary patch for their 75th season.
Calgary: New Black Alternates introduced. Crest has its alternate Flaming-Horse Logo.
Colorado: No updates in the regular season, but in the 1999 Playoffs, the Avalanche wore a CHS patch for the victims of the Columbine High School massacre on their left sleeve just above the number. The patch remained on the jerseys throughout the playoffs.
Florida: The names on the back become vertically arched, and a navy blue alternate jersey is introduced. On that jersey, the panther is breaking a stick in half.
Los Angeles: Jerseys Redesigned, Purple is Reintroduced.
Nashville: white jerseys include a Blue triangle for the Crest, and the blue ones do not. The team wore an Inaugural season patch that would later become the team's alternate logo.
New York Islanders: The jerseys reverted to its 1978–1995 design, retaining navy blue as its main color with a patch on the right shoulder featuring four diagonal stripes, symbolizing the team's four Stanley Cup titles in the 1980s.
New York Rangers: White Lady Liberty Jerseys.
Phoenix: The Coyotes introduce a new green alternate jersey, complete with a desertscape at the bottom and the sleeve ends
St Louis: Alternates are retired and adopt a new color scheme
San Jose: Alternates are retired and become the basis of the team's new uniforms.
Tampa Bay: All-Star Game Patches for the 1999 NHL All-Star Game in Tampa.
Toronto: Team wore alternate throwbacks and a patch to commemorate their final season at Maple Leaf Gardens.
Washington: For the first few games, the Capitals wore a patch celebrating their 25th season in the NHL. The patch was worn on the upper right chest.

Regular season
The 1998–99 season marked the retirement of Wayne Gretzky, the NHL's all-time leading scorer, who played his final three NHL seasons with the New York Rangers.

This was the final season that Fox televised NHL games in the United States. It was also the final season for the Toronto Maple Leafs at Maple Leaf Gardens, before moving to the Air Canada Centre in February and marked Toronto's first post-season appearance since the 1995–96 season. 1998–99 was also the final year that the Carolina Hurricanes played at Greensboro Coliseum; they moved to the brand-new Raleigh Entertainment and Sports Arena in Raleigh for the next season. The Colorado Avalanche played their fourth and final season at McNichols Sports Arena and would move to Pepsi Center the following season. The Los Angeles Kings played their final season at the Great Western Forum after 32 seasons before moving to the Staples Center for the next season.

In an effort to reduce the number of disallowed goals due to the skate-in-the-crease violation, the goal crease shape and size was significantly reduced. In spite of this, goaltenders and defensive systems continued to dominate the league, as only two teams, the Toronto Maple Leafs and the New Jersey Devils, averaged more than three goals scored per game. In addition, no player reached the 50-goal plateau. A total of 160 shutouts were recorded for the second-straight regular season.

Final standings

Eastern Conference

Western Conference

Playoffs

Bracket

Awards

All-Star teams

Player statistics

Scoring leaders
Note: GP = Games played; G = Goals; A = Assists; Pts = Points

Source: NHL.

Leading goaltenders
Regular season

Coaches

Eastern Conference
Boston Bruins: Pat Burns
Buffalo Sabres: Lindy Ruff
Carolina Hurricanes: Paul Maurice
Florida Panthers: Terry Murray
Montreal Canadiens: Alain Vigneault
New Jersey Devils: Robbie Ftorek
New York Islanders: Mike Milbury and Bill Stewart
New York Rangers: John Muckler
Ottawa Senators: Jacques Martin
Philadelphia Flyers: Roger Neilson
Pittsburgh Penguins: Kevin Constantine
Tampa Bay Lightning: Jacques Demers
Toronto Maple Leafs: Pat Quinn
Washington Capitals: Ron Wilson

Western Conference
Mighty Ducks of Anaheim: Craig Hartsburg
Calgary Flames: Brian Sutter
Chicago Blackhawks: Dirk Graham
Colorado Avalanche: Bob Hartley
Dallas Stars: Ken Hitchcock
Detroit Red Wings: Scotty Bowman
Edmonton Oilers: Ron Low
Los Angeles Kings: Larry Robinson
Nashville Predators: Barry Trotz
Phoenix Coyotes: Jim Schoenfeld
San Jose Sharks: Darryl Sutter
St. Louis Blues: Joel Quenneville
Vancouver Canucks: Mike Keenan

Milestones

Debuts

The following is a list of players of note who played their first NHL game in 1998–99 (listed with their first team, an asterisk(*) marks debut in playoffs):

Martin St. Louis, Calgary Flames
Chris Drury, Colorado Avalanche
Milan Hejduk, Colorado Avalanche
Dan Boyle, Florida Panthers
Jason Blake, Los Angeles Kings
David Legwand, Nashville Predators
Karlis Skrastins, Nashville Predators
Kimmo Timonen, Nashville Predators
Eric Brewer, New York Islanders
Vincent Lecavalier, Tampa Bay Lightning
Tomas Kaberle, Toronto Maple Leafs

Last games

The following is a list of players of note who played their last game in the NHL in 1998–99 (listed with their last team):

 Dave Babych, Los Angeles Kings
 Brian Bellows, Washington Capitals
 Jim Carey, St. Louis Blues
 Bobby Carpenter, New Jersey Devils
 Dino Ciccarelli, Florida Panthers
 Russ Courtnall, Los Angeles Kings
 John Cullen, Tampa Bay Lightning
 Wayne Gretzky, New York Rangers
 Ron Hextall, Philadelphia Flyers
 Dale Hunter, Colorado Avalanche
 Craig Ludwig, Dallas Stars
 Jamie Macoun, Detroit Red Wings 
 Bernie Nicholls, San Jose Sharks
 Kjell Samuelsson, Tampa Bay Lightning (Last player born in the 1950's)
 Tomas Sandstrom, Mighty Ducks of Anaheim
 Esa Tikkanen, Florida Panthers

Trading deadline
 Trading Deadline: March 23, 1999
March 23, 1999: Nashville traded RW Blair Atcheynum to St. Louis for a sixth-round pick in the 2000 Entry Draft.
March 23, 1999: Calgary traded D Chris O'Sullivan to NY Rangers for D Lee Sorochan.
March 23, 1999: Detroit traded G Kevin Hodson and San Jose's second-round pick in the 1999 Entry Draft (previously acquired) to Tampa Bay for LW Wendel Clark and Detroit's sixth-round pick in the 1999 Entry Draft (previously acquired).
March 23, 1999: Washington traded C Dale Hunter and a third-round pick in the 2000 Entry Draft to Colorado for a second-round pick in the 1999 or 2000 Entry Draft.
March 23, 1999: Florida traded D Rhett Warrener and a fifth-round pick in the 1999 Entry Draft to Buffalo for D Mike Wilson.
March 23, 1999: Calgary traded RW Greg Pankewicz to San Jose for future considerations.
March 23, 1999: Los Angeles traded C Yanic Perreault to Toronto for C Jason Podollan and a third-round pick in the 1999 Entry Draft.
March 23, 1999: Edmonton traded RW Kevin Brown to NY Rangers for LW Vladimir Vorobiev.
March 23, 1999: Tampa Bay traded G Bill Ranford to Detroit for a conditional draft pick.
March 23, 1999: Chicago traded D Chris Chelios to Detroit for 1999 and 2001 first-round draft picks (D Steve McCarthy and G Adam Munro)
March 23, 1999: Montreal traded C Vincent Damphousse to San Jose for a fifth-round pick in the 1999 Entry Draft and a conditional draft pick or picks in the 2000 Entry Draft.
March 23, 1999: Vancouver traded C Peter Zezel to Anaheim for future considerations.
March 23, 1999: Los Angeles traded D Steve Duchesne to Philadelphia for D Dave Babych and a fifth-round pick in the 2000 Entry Draft.
March 23, 1999: NY Rangers trade D Stan Neckar to Phoenix for D Jason Doig and a sixth-round pick in the 1999 Entry Draft.
March 23, 1999: NY Rangers trade D Ulf Samuelsson to Detroit for a second-round pick in the 1999 Entry Draft and a third-round pick in the 2000 Entry Draft.
March 23, 1999: Toronto traded D Jason Smith to Edmonton for a fourth-round pick in the 1999 Entry Draft and a second-round pick in the 2000 Entry Draft.
March 23, 1999: Buffalo traded C Derek Plante to Dallas for a second-round pick in the 1999 Entry Draft.
March 23, 1999: Washington traded LW Craig Berube to Philadelphia for future considerations.
March 23, 1999: Tampa Bay traded D Sami Helenius to Colorado for a conditional draft pick.
March 23, 1999: Phoenix traded C Jean-Francois Jomphe to Montreal for future considerations.
March 23, 1999: Chicago traded RW Nelson Emerson to Ottawa for RW Chris Murray.

See also
 List of Stanley Cup champions
 1998 NHL Entry Draft
 1998 NHL Expansion Draft
 49th National Hockey League All-Star Game
 National Hockey League All-Star Game
 1998 in sports
 1999 in sports

References
 
 
 
 
Notes

External links
Hockey Database
http://nhl.com/

 
1998–99 in Canadian ice hockey by league
1998–99 in American ice hockey by league